The Alice B. Toklas Cook Book, first published in 1954, is one of the bestselling cookbooks of all time. Alice B. Toklas, writer Gertrude Stein's life partner, wrote the book to make up for her unwillingness at the time to write her memoirs, in deference to Stein's 1933 book, The Autobiography of Alice B. Toklas.

This work is as much of an autobiography as it is a cookbook, in that it contains as many personal recollections as it does recipes. The most famous culinary experiment is a concoction called "Hashish Fudge". Made from spices, nuts, fruit, and cannabis, Hashish Fudge quickly became a sensation in its own right. In the recipe, Toklas says it is called "the food of paradise" and goes on to suggest places where the cook might find the cannabis. She adds that the fudge can liven up any gathering and is "easy to whip up on a rainy day." She cautions two pieces are quite enough and that one should be prepared for hysterical fits of laughter and wild floods of thoughts on "many simultaneous planes."

Although Toklas later said that this recipe was given to her by her friend Brion Gysin, her name is forever linked with cannabis edibles due to its great success.

References

External links
 
 

1954 non-fiction books
American books about cannabis
American cookbooks
Books about Gertrude Stein
Cannabis cookbooks
Harper & Brothers books